Samantha Mary Lynn Cabiles is a Filipina figure skater. She is the former national junior champion of the Philippines. She is based in the United States.

References

External links

1996 births
Living people
Figure skaters at the 2017 Asian Winter Games